Carios is a genus of ticks belonging to the family Argasidae.

The genus has cosmopolitan distribution.

Species

Species:

Carios amblus 
Carios aragaoi 
Carios armasi

References

Argasidae